The Conquest of the Citadel is a 1977 West German drama film directed by Bernhard Wicki. It was entered into the 27th Berlin International Film Festival.

Cast
 András Fricsay Kali Son as Hermann Brucker
 Antonia Reininghaus as Alessandra
 Armando Brancia as Rodolfo Battipana
 Dieter Kirchlechner as Niccolo Battipana
 Ivan Desny as Faconi
 Kostas Papanastasiou as Yamalakis
 Kurt Mergenthal as Iker
 Vittoria Di Silverio as Rosa Battipana
 Assunta De Maggi as Sophia
 Elena De Maggi as Lucia

References

External links

1977 films
1977 drama films
German drama films
West German films
1970s German-language films
Films directed by Bernhard Wicki
Films based on German novels
Films set in Italy
1970s German films